Himalayan Adventure Challange is an adventure race held every year in India. It is considered an extreme sport because its held on slopes of Himalayas range. Its a Triathlon race which includes Rafting, Hiking  and Mountain biking. It is an elite Obstacle course racing similar to Spartan Race which is considered toughest obstacle course race.

History
The events held by Aqua Terra Trust. It was started in July 2013 after 2013 Uttarakhand floods and to promote tourism in flood affected areas. From then it held every year at Atali Ganga Race track in Rishikesh, Uttarakhand.

Events 
There events varies upon edition. The events can be for Individuals or team. The events are sponsored by various athletics organisation.

 10  kilometre (Intro.) - 5 km rafting + 5 km hiking
 30 kilometer ( Open) – 16 km hiking + 14 km rafting
 65 kilometre (Zealot) – 30 km mountain biking + 21 km hiking + 14 km rafting
 75 kilometre - hiking + cross country cycling + paddling

References

External links 
Website: 

Obstacle racing
Adventure racing